The Mexican women's national under-16 and under-17 basketball team is a national basketball team of Mexico and is governed by the Asociación Deportiva Mexicana de Básquetbol.  It represents the country in international under-16 and under-17 (under age 16 and under age 17) women's basketball competitions.

The 2019 team won the Under-17 Women's Centrobasket after beating Puerto Rico in the finals 61–56 and ultimately secured one of three qualifying spots for the 2021 FIBA Under-16 Women's Americas Championship. In 2024, Mexico will host the FIBA Under-17 Women's Basketball World Cup. It will be the first time that Mexico has hosted a FIBA global event, which earn Mexico an automatic qualification as host.

World Cup results

See also
Mexico women's national basketball team
Mexico women's national under-19 basketball team
Mexico men's national under-17 basketball team

References

External links

Women's national under-17 basketball teams
Basketball